GAUSS is a matrix programming language for mathematics and statistics, developed and marketed by Aptech Systems. Its primary purpose is the solution of numerical problems in statistics, econometrics, time-series, optimization and 2D- and 3D-visualization. It was first published in 1984 for MS-DOS and is available for Linux, macOS and Windows.

Examples 
 GAUSS has several Application Modules as well as functions in its Run-Time Library (i.e., functions that come with GAUSS without extra cost)
 Qprog – Quadratic programming
 SqpSolvemt – Sequential quadratic programming
 QNewton - Quasi-Newton unconstrained optimization
 EQsolve - Nonlinear equations solver

GAUSS Applications 
A range of toolboxes are available for GAUSS at additional cost.

See also 
 List of numerical-analysis software
 Comparison of numerical-analysis software

References

External links 
International homepage
GAUSS Mailing List
Review of version 7.0
Some more links

Econometrics software
Mathematical optimization software
Numerical programming languages
Statistical programming languages
Proprietary commercial software for Linux